The International Open Data Charter is a set of principles and best practices for the release of governmental open data. The charter was formally adopted by seventeen governments of countries, states and cities at the Open Government Partnership Global Summit in Mexico in October 2015. The original signatories included the governments of Chile, Guatemala, France, Italy, Mexico, Philippines, South Korea, the United Kingdom and Uruguay, the cities of Buenos Aires, Minatitlán, Puebla, Veracruz,  Montevideo, Reynosa, and the Mexican states of Morelos and Xalapa. As of 2020, 74 national and local governments are signatories.

Principles 
The charter mandates that data released by governments comply with these principles:
 Open by Default
 Timely and Comprehensive
 Accessible and Usable
 Comparable and Interoperable
 For Improved Governance and Citizen Engagement
 For Inclusive Development and Innovation

Implementation

New Zealand 
New Zealand joined the Open Data Charter in 2017. The charter supports and builds on the New Zealand Declaration on Open and Transparent Government   and the Data and Information Management Principles . The goals of New Zealand are to enforce its commitment to open data, ensure it remains internationally aligned, and provide government agencies with a more modern and clear articulation of principles and supporting actions for accelerating the release of open government data.

See also 
Open data
Open government

References

External links
 Official website

Open data
Open government